Bayside, Virginia may refer to:
Bayside, Accomack County, Virginia
Bayside, Westmoreland County, Virginia
Bayside, Virginia Beach, a neighborhood of the city of Virginia Beach, Virginia